Ara Abrahamyan (born 15 April 1957 in Malishka, Yeghegnadzor District, Armenia)  is a prominent philanthropist, social activist, and businessmen. He was born in Malishka, a village in Vayots Dzor Region, Armenia, in a family of physicians. He attended Yerevan State Agricultural University and gained a degree in economics.

Career 

He started his career path as an engineer in “Neuron” Industrial enterprise growing to the General Manager of the company. In 1989, he was appointed the Deputy Head of the Department at the USSR Ministry of Electronic Industry. Benevolence dining hall “Arshavir and Baidzar Abrahamyan” opened in Yerevan in 2001.

Ara Abrahamyan has hold the position of the President of the Union of Armenians in Russia since 2000 and the President of the World Armenian Congress since 2003. He is also a co-Chairman  of Production Councils with South Korea, Brazil, Argentina, France, Nigeria, Libya and the Russian Federation. He is also the current leader of the Armenia is Our Home party.

He participated in the releasing of 6 Armenian pilots from Equatorial Guinea in 2005, detained by local authorities, and in the rescue of 12 Russian sailors, detained in Nigeria in 2006.

Achievements/Orders 

 1991 - “Honored Employee” medal by USSR Ministry of Electronic Industry
 1996 - Russian Federation Presidential Certificate of Honor
 1998 - Night cross of Saint Constantine the Great
 1999 – Honored builder of Russia
 1999 – UNESCO Certificate of Honor for high social activity (for participation in rebuilding the Kremlin Fortress)
 2000 - “Saint Enlightener Order”, the highest award of the Armenian Apostolic Church, for merits to the Armenian people.
 2001 – “For genuine dedication” medal by “Orthodox Russia” Social Movement.
 2001 - “For strengthening Military Cooperation” medal by the Ministry of Defense of Russian Federation.
 2001, 2003, 2005, 2011- “Man of the Year” national prize of Russian Federation for strengthening the civil society.
 2002 – Order of Friendship of Russian Federation
 2003 – Gold medal by the National Academy of Sciences of Armenia.
 2003 – UNESCO’s “Good Will Ambassador”
 2005 - National order of the legion of Honor of France. For developing Russian-French relations and promoting greater cooperation.

References

External links
 Persons.am

1957 births
Living people
People from Malishka
Russian people of Armenian descent
Russian businesspeople
Yerevan State University alumni
UNESCO Goodwill Ambassadors